The 15th edition of Mawazine Festival, an international music festival held annually in the Moroccan capital of Rabat, took place from 20 May to 28 May 2016.

OLM Souissi stage
The R&B singer Chris Brown opened the festival in OLM Souissi stage, May 20. Followed by, the next day, the Australian rapper Iggy Azalea who performed for 90 000 fans.
The French pop star Maître Gims, Wyclef Jean, Shaggy, Pitbull, and Kendji Girac have also performed on the stage. But the most attended shows in OLM Souissi stage were: Hardwell's and Christina Aguilera's, with 180 000 and 250 000 people attending respectively.
Also, Christina Aguilera's show happened to be the most attended show of a female western entertainer.

Nahda stage
Diana Haddad opened the festival in the Nahda stage, in front of thousands of fans. Melhem Barakat, Hatem Al-Iraqi, Yara, and Saber Rebaï have all performed later on the stage.

Myriam Fares gave her first performance in the festival on the Nahda stage after giving birth to her son. Sherine also gave a performance after announcing earlier that she would retire. Assi El Helani performed in front of 80 000 fans in the same stage, and Saad Lamjarred also performed, Friday, May 27 for 140 000 fans.

Bouragrag stage
Rokia Traoré, Marcus Miller, Bombino, Faiz Ali Faiz, Ernest Ranglin & Friends, The Afrobeat Experience, Omar Sosa & Friends, National Orchestra of Barbes all performed in the Bouragrag stage. Mokhtar Samba closed the festival Saturday, May 28.

Salé stage
The stage welcomed mostly Moroccan artists, with live performances from Hatim Idar, Mohammed Reda, Zinab Oussama, DJ K-Rim, Rhany, Saïda Fikri, Ahouzar, the Amazigh diva Fatima Tachtoukt, Najat Tazi, the Tangaoui pop singer Aminux, Sami Ray, Kader Japonais, the Moroccan band Hoba Hoba Spirit, Gabacho Maroc, Darga, Alamri, Chaabi singers Hajib and Abdelaziz Stati, Moroccan rappers Muslim, H-Kayne and H-name, Douzi, Rachid Berriah, Rachid Casta, Bilal El Maghribi and Hamid El Mardi. But the highlight of the stage was the Moroccan Chaâbi singer Najat Aatabou, who set a record for the most attended show of a female entertainer ever, with more than 300 000 people attending.

Chellah stage
Alireza Ghorbani, Noëmie Waysfeld, Kakushin Nishihara and Gaspar Claus, The Musicians of Cairo, Souffles Quartet, Antonio Castrignanò, Ines Bacán, Majid Bekkas, and Pedro Soler have all performed in the Chellah stage.

Théatre Mohammed V
Kadhim Al-Sahir opened the Mawazine festival in Théatre Mohammed V with a sold-out show. Alma de Tango, Le Trio Joubran, Natacha Atlas, Qawwali Flamenco, Imany, Paco Renteria, El Gusto, and Safwan Bahlawan also performed in the stage.

References

Festivals in Morocco